The South America Hongwanji Mission also known as Comunidade Budista Sul-Amelicana Jodo-Shinshu Honpa Hongwanji is a district of the Nishi Hongan-ji branch of Jōdo Shinshū Buddhism.

History
Jōdo Shinshū wa established in South America in tandem with the immigration of Japanese people. The Mission was officially recognized by the Brazilian government in 1955 and is the most recent among overseas temple districts.

The Betsuin (head temple) is currently located in Sao Paulo. The organization oversees 35 temples, 17 ministers, 17 assistant ministers and approximately 10,000 members in Brazil, Paraguay, Peru, and Argentina.

Locations

Brazil
Templo Honpa Hongwanji de Brasília
Templo Honpa Hongwanji de Tomé-Açu
Templo Honpa Hongwanji de Cuiabá
Templo Honpa Hongwanji Belém
Templo Honpa Hongwanji - Anápolis
Templo Honpa Hongwanji de Goiânia
Templo Honpa Hongwanji do Rio de Janeiro
Templo Monshinji
Templo Honpa Hongwanji de Paraíba
Templo Honpa Hongwanji de São José dos Campos
Templo Honpa Hongwanji de Campinas
Templo Honpa Hongwanji Itu Bukyo-Kai 
Templo Honpa Hongwanji de Mogi das Cruzes
Templo Honpa Hongwanji de Suzano
Templo Honpa Hongwanji Itaquera Bukyo-Kai
Templo Honpa Hongwanji de Santo André
Templo Honpa Hongwanji de Joshinji
Templo Honpa Hongwanji de São Paulo
Templo Honpa Hongwanji de Osasco
Templo Honpa Hongwanji Piedade Bukyo-Kai
Templo Honpa Hongwanji Pilar do Sul Bukyo-Kai
Templo Honpa Hongwanji de Registro 
Pereira Barreto Honpa Bukyo-Kai 
Templo Honpa Hongwanji de Andradina
Mirandópolis Bukyo-Kai
Guararapes Bukyo-Kai
Templo Honpa Hongwanji de Noroeste
Templo Honpa Hongwanji de Lins
Templo de Komyoji
Tupi Paulista Bukyo-Kay
Dracena Bukyo-Kay
Templo Honpa Hongwanji de Junqueirópolis
Templo Honpa Hongwanji de Pacaembu
Florida Paulista Bukyo-Kay
Templo Honpa Hongwanji de Adamantina
Templo Honpa Hongwanji de Lucélia
Templo Honpa Hongwanji de Osvaldo Cruz
Templo Honpa Hongwanji de Tupã
Templo Honpa Hongwanji Pompéia Shinshu Bukyo-Kai
Templo Honpa Hongwanji de Marília
Templo Honpa Hongwanji de Anrakuji
Templo Honpa Hongwanji de Presidente Prudente
Templo Honpa Hongwanji de Ourinhos
Templo Honpa Hongwanji de Paranavaí
Templo Honpa Hongwanji de Maringá
Mandaguari Bukyo-Kay
Rolândia Bukyo-Kay
Templo Honpa Hongwanji de Londrina
Templo Honpa Hongwanji de Registro
Templo Hongwanji de Curitiba
Templo Honpa Hongwanji de Amambay

Paraguay

Peru
Templo Honpa Hongwanji de Peru

Argentina
Templo Honpa-Hongwanji de Buenos Aires

References

External links
Jodo Shinshu Hongwanji-ha Hongwanji International Center - South America
Federação Budista Sul-Americana Jodo Shinshu Honpa Hongwanji (in Portuguese)
Hongwanji Betsuin Homepage (in Portuguese)
Federacao Budista Sul-America

Shinshū Honganji-ha
Buddhist temples in South America
Japanese diaspora in South America
1955 establishments in Brazil
Buddhist organizations in South America